Yevgeniy Bulanchik (3 April 1922 – 17 November 1995) was a Ukrainian former athlete who competed in the 1952 Summer Olympics.

References

1922 births
1995 deaths
Ukrainian male hurdlers
Olympic athletes of the Soviet Union
Athletes (track and field) at the 1952 Summer Olympics
European Athletics Championships medalists
Soviet male hurdlers